The Listener is an album by jazz drummer Jeff Willams, an American expatriate in England. The album was released on 4 June 4, 2013 by Whirlwind Recordings.

Track list
 Beer and Water
 Borderline
 She Can't Be a Spy
 Fez
 Lament
 Scrunge/Search Me
 Slew Footed
 Dedicated to You

Personnel
 Jeff Willams – drums
 Duane Eubanks – trumpet
 John O' Gallagher – alto saxophone
 John Hébert – double bass

References

2013 albums